Estadio Alfonso López is a multi-purpose stadium in Bucaramanga, Colombia.  It is currently used mostly for football matches.  The stadium has a capacity of 25,000 people, and is the home of Atlético Bucaramanga. From 2006 to 2016 it had the first synthetic grass pitch in Colombia. Alfonso López stadium is part of the larger Villa Olímpica Alfonso López.

See also
Coliseo Bicentenario

References

External links 

Estadio Alfonso Lopez Stadium in Bucaramanga - World Stadiums

Alfonso Lopez
Atlético Bucaramanga
Multi-purpose stadiums in Colombia
Buildings and structures in Santander Department